Eugene McDowell (July 4, 1939 – January 26, 2021) was an American college football coach and college athletics administrator. He served as the head football coach at University of Central Florida (UCF) from 1985 to 1997, compiling a record of 86–61. McDowell was also the athletic director at UCF from 1985 to 1992.

McDowell died of leukemia on January 26, 2021, in Quincy, Florida.

Head coaching record

References

1939 births
2021 deaths
American football linebackers
Florida State Seminoles football coaches
Florida State Seminoles football players
Kansas State Wildcats football coaches
UCF Knights football coaches
UCF Knights athletic directors
Deaths from cancer in Florida
Deaths from leukemia